The 2nd constituency of Meurthe-et-Moselle is a French legislative constituency in the Meurthe-et-Moselle département.

Description

Meurthe-et-Moselle's 2nd constituency contains the western part of Nancy as well as the large commuter suburb of Vandœuvre-lès-Nancy.

The seat is marginal but was held by Hervé Feron of the Socialist Party until 2017.

Historic Representation

Election results

2022 

 
 
|-
| colspan="8" bgcolor="#E9E9E9"|
|-

2017

2012

 
 
 
 
 
 
|-
| colspan="8" bgcolor="#E9E9E9"|
|-

Sources
Official results of French elections from 2002: "Résultats électoraux officiels en France" (in French).

2